Supernatural is a British anthology television series that was produced by the BBC in 1977. The series consisted of eight episodes and was broadcast on BBC1. In each episode, a prospective member of the "Club of the Damned" was required to tell a horror story, and their application for membership would be judged on how frightening the story was. Applicants who failed to tell a sufficiently frightening story would be killed.

Overview
Series creator Robert Muller, who also wrote seven of the eight screenplays, said: "The idea was to tell the kind of Gothic tale that we don't have on television, something akin to the old horror films of the 1920s and 1930s. What we get now are thrillers set in modern times with lots of blood and violence. There is no blood and no violence in this series. They are tales about ghosts, vampires, werewolves, that sort of thing. Highly romantic and highly charged with fear and menace."

Although each episode was a stand-alone story, episodes 2 and 3 shared a cast and linked plot. These two episodes starred English actress Billie Whitelaw, who was married to Muller. She said: "Robert wrote the story with me in mind, but I said I would not read it until it was sent to me by a producer or director. I wanted the thing kept on a professional footing. During rehearsals we never discussed the play at home, and in the rehearsal room I would never address Robert directly if I had any query or suggestion. I would always go through the director."

Vladek Sheybal won the Dracula Society's prestigious Hamilton Deane Award for the best dramatic performance or presentation in the Gothic horror/supernatural genres for his performance in "Night of the Marionettes". Sheybal played "Herr Hubert", an Austrian innkeeper with life-size puppets in a story based around Mary Shelley's Frankenstein.

Overall, Supernatural received a mixed response from audiences and low ratings, most likely due to its summertime transmission despite being a gothic horror show featuring mythic monsters and death. It effectively ended after only one series.

In 2014, episodes 6-8 were repeated for the Halloween season on BBC Four.

Episode list

DVD release
Supernatural was released on 18 November 2013 as part of the British Film Institute's Gothic: The Dark Heart of Film celebration. The 2-disc set contains four episodes on each disc, presented in the original transmission order.

Companion book
A companion book, Supernatural: Haunting Stories of Gothic Terror, was published to coincide with the series, with each screenplay adapted as a short story. The cover of the first edition comprised a photograph of Whitelaw taken during the production of "Countess Ilona" and the tag-line "Now on BBC-TV." The adaptations are:

References

External links
 
 
 Supernatural at Action TV

1977 British television series debuts
1977 British television series endings
1970s British drama television series
British supernatural television shows
BBC television dramas
1970s British anthology television series
British horror fiction television series
English-language television shows